Orthogonius baumi is a species of ground beetle in the subfamily Orthogoniinae. It was described by Jedlicka in 1955.

References

baumi
Beetles described in 1955